Members of the Church of Jesus Christ of Latter-day Saints (LDS Church) and other adherents in the Latter Day Saint movement, believe that there will be a Second Coming of Jesus Christ to the earth sometime in the future. The LDS Church and its leaders do not make predictions of the actual date of the Second Coming.

According to LDS Church teachings, the restored gospel will be taught in all parts of the world prior to the Second Coming. The members of the church believe that the scriptures prophesy that there will be wars, rumors of wars, earthquakes, hurricanes, and other man-made and natural disasters prior to the Second Coming.

Purpose
The LDS Church teaches that God loves all people, both those who are present on the earth, as well as those who have been on the earth previously. LDS theology holds that all people will be resurrected because of the atonement of Christ; however, in order to gain exaltation, there are certain ordinances which must be performed while on the earth, including baptism, confirmation, temple endowment, and celestial marriage. The LDS Church believes that God will provide a way for those who have not received the required ordinances to have the work done for them. Human beings will not miss the chance to get into heaven due to failing to learn about or embrace Latter-day Saint teachings while alive. Through temple work done by living proxies and through missionary work taking place in the spirit world, the church claims that all people will have the opportunity to accept these ordinances, even if not until after they have died.

It is believed that those who have died who have not received these ordinances, or do not know or understand about Christ, will be taught in the afterlife. This work is done similar to the way missionary work is done in life. It is believed that in the afterlife, individuals retain their beliefs, knowledge and agency, and they will still be able to choose for themselves what they desire. Having the work done for them does nothing unless they desire it. It will not change their religion, beliefs, or feelings, unless they themselves decide to accept the work done for them.

LDS Church members currently perform this work by researching genealogical records for the names of deceased persons in their families, performing ordinances such as baptism and marriage with living proxies in temple ceremonies. Church members believe that those who have died who have also received these ordinances act as missionaries to the unconverted who have passed on in an effort to persuade them to accept the work done on their behalf and accept the parts of the gospel that they did not learn or accept in life. Latter-day Saints believe that this work will continue after the Second Coming, during a period Latter-day Saints refer to as the Millennium.  The LDS Church teaches that Jesus Christ will return to the earth to prepare for ordinance and conversion work to be done for all people who have ever lived, as well as to prepare the Earth itself for the completion of its mission as a testing ground for human souls.

Timing
According to the Doctrine and Covenants, which is considered scriptural canon in the LDS Church, "[the Son of Man] now reigneth in the heavens and will reign till he descends on the earth … which time is nigh at hand … but the hour and the day no man knoweth, neither the angels in heaven, nor shall they know until he comes."

The LDS Church teaches that no person will be given the knowledge of when the Second Coming is to occur. There are no official teachings speculating about an exact time or date. Although the exact time and date is not known, Latter-day Saints believe that specific events must take place as signs before the Second Coming can occur.

Events
The LDS Church teaches that Jesus will come in "power and great glory." Latter-day Saints believe that the person who will arrive is the same Jesus as the one who ascended to heaven in the New Testament account and that he will still have the marks of the nails in his hands and feet that he gained from the Crucifixion when he returns.

Signs
The LDS Church teaches that the entire Earth will be aware of the arrival of Jesus, including non-believers.

Events that are specified in Church teachings to occur at the Second Coming include:

 There will appear a great sign in heaven, and all the people shall see it.
 The righteous that are upon the earth will be caught up to meet him.
 Angels will announce his return, which all the inhabitants of the earth will hear, and every knee shall bow.

Actions of Christ
The LDS Church is fairly specific about the events that will occur at the Second Coming.

 Christ will complete the First Resurrection. This event involves Jesus resurrecting some of mankind. The LDS Church believes that the spirit world is a place where the souls of the dead reside prior to the Second Coming and Final Judgment but that this is not the soul's final resting place. They believe that all the people of the earth will be resurrected and receive their physical body again, however, depending on their righteousness, this resurrection may occur at a different time for some. They believe that after being judged, the souls of man will be placed in one of three separate kingdoms. Those who will obtain the highest kingdom will be resurrected first, followed by those who will obtain the second kingdom. This completes the First Resurrection. Those who obtain the lowest or no kingdom remain in spirit prison until the completion of the millennium.
 He will judge the nations, and divide the righteous from the wicked.
 The wicked will be removed from the earth. All things that are corrupt will be burned, and the earth will be cleansed with fire. Those who are good people, regardless of faith or beliefs, will remain.
 The Jewish people who are living at the time will be able to see, touch and feel the nail marks in his hands and feet, and will mourn because they, as a people, had rejected Jesus as the Messiah.
 Jesus will directly rule as King of heaven and earth. He will establish a theocratic government and will usher in the new Millennium.

The Millennium
According to LDS Church doctrine, the Millennium is believed to be a period of peace and righteousness. During this time, Jesus will personally reign on the earth, and Satan will be bound and have no power over the people due to their righteousness.

Latter-day Saints teach that during the first part of the Millennium, many missionaries will be needed throughout the world to teach those on the Earth. However, as time progresses, missionary work will decrease as the knowledge that Jesus is the Christ and knowledge about the gospel spreads.

During the Millennium, the majority of the work and ordinances necessary for salvation for those who have died will be completed. The LDS Church teaches that the individuals retain free will whether or not they chose to perform the ordinances themselves or if the ordinances were performed by proxy. Doctrinally, deceased individuals must voluntarily accept the ordinances and become converted to the teachings of Christ for them to come into effect. Latter-day Saints believe that the human family tree all the way to Adam will have its temple ordinances completed. This work will be made possible through the help of those who have been resurrected at or before the Second Coming of Christ.

Latter-day Saints believe that organizations and families will continue through the Millennium similar as they are now.

Close to the end of the Millennium, it is believed that Satan will be loosed for a short period of time. At this point, the Archangel Michael, who the LDS Church teaches is the same person as Adam, will lead the righteous in a final battle against Satan and his followers. Church teachings hold that Satan and his followers will be cast into a place referred to as outer darkness. Because Satan and his followers had once lived in the presence of God, they have an undeniable knowledge of God, Jesus Christ, and their plan for humanity. Their rebellion is treated as the only unforgivable sin in LDS belief: knowing rebellion against God's plan and attempting to deceive the people who inhabit the earth. The only people that lived on the Earth that will be cast out with Satan are those who have gained a similarly complete, undeniable understanding of God and his plan, and then denied or falsified this truth. These are known as the Sons of Perdition.

It is believed at the close of the Millennium, with all the work complete, the final judgment of the souls of human beings will take place. The Earth will then receive its paradisaical glory or become "celestialized" and those who lived on this earth and worthy of celestial glory, will inherit it and live with God and Christ.

Major signs preceding
The LDS Church believes that no man shall know the hour of the coming of Christ, however there are signs which have been given which will show that the Second Coming is approaching. Some of the major events, and their believed fulfillment states that have been prophesied, are listed below:

Restitution of all things
The Book of Acts states, "Repent ye therefore, and be converted, that your sins may be blotted out, when the times of refreshing shall come from the presence of the Lord; And he shall send Jesus Christ, which before was preached unto you: Whom the heaven must receive until the times of restitution of all things, which God hath spoken by the mouth of all his holy prophets since the world began." It is believed that this means that there must be a restitution of all things before the Second Coming. The Book of Revelation says, "And I saw another angel fly in the midst of heaven, having the everlasting gospel to preach unto them that dwell on the earth, and to every nation, and kindred, and tongue, and people". This gospel believed to be the same church that was on the earth when Christ was here initially, and that it must be restored to the earth. It would then be established throughout the world. The LDS Church believes that the true church that was originally formed became corrupted within decades of being established by Jesus Christ. Since God is the same yesterday, today and always, this restoration would need to be done through divine revelation, the same as it has been done in times of old.

Believed fulfillment state: Majority fulfilled (more yet to come)
 The LDS Church believes this was done with Joseph Smith and that he did receive divine revelation, and was called to be a prophet in modern times. The LDS Church believes itself to be the true church and that it has all of the signs in scripture about the workings of the true church. They also believe "in the same organization that existed in the Primitive Church, namely apostles, prophets, pastors, teachers, evangelists, and so forth".

Opposition to the restoration
It is believed that if there is truly a God, there must truly be a Devil. If there was true doctrine taught from God, then there must truly be a force that would do everything in his power to make men believe anything but the truth. That means that if there was a true Church established by revelation, that there must be great opposition to the truth, and that those people that followed it would be seen as strange and peculiar by most.

Believed fulfillment state: Fulfilled
 The LDS Church believes this has been fulfilled, both with the persecution of the early Saints, and the way that many view the LDS Church and its people now. There are many rumors that persist which are blatant falsehoods about the people in the Church, ranging from the practice of polygamy to members participating in secretive Masonic temple rituals.

Elijah
In the Book of Malachi, it is prophesied that before the Second Coming, "Behold, I will send you Elijah the prophet before the coming of the great and dreadful day of the Lord:  And he shall turn the heart of the fathers to the children, and the heart of the children to their fathers".

Believed fulfillment state: Fulfilled
It is believed that Elijah appeared to the prophet Joseph Smith on April 3, 1836, and conferred upon him the keys to the current dispensation. Although many faiths believe that Elijah will come before the Second Coming, The LDS Church is the only major Christian denomination that believes that he already has.

Gathering of Israel 

The 10th Article of Faith states: "We believe in the literal gathering of Israel and in the restoration of the Ten Tribes." The tribe of Ephraim is given the privilege of leading the gathering, with the tribe of Manasseh assisting.

Believed fulfillment state: Fulfilled and in progress

Gathering of Judah 
The Book of Isaiah states: "And he shall set up an ensign for the nations, and shall assemble the outcasts of Israel, and gather together the dispersed of Judah from the four corners of the earth." The LDS Church believes in both a literal gathering, and a figurative gathering. The ensign is believed to be the church, and the figurative gathering is the gathering of members into the church. The literal gathering of the dispersed of Judah is believed to be a gathering back into the Holy Land.

Believed fulfillment state: Fulfilled and in progress
In 1841 the LDS Church sent apostle Orson Hyde to the Holy Land to dedicate the land for the return of the Jewish people. At the time there were fewer than 5,000 Jewish people in the entire land of Palestine. , there were millions of Jewish people within Israel.

Proselytizing in Israel
A sign that has yet to take place is the commencement of missionary work within Israel. The LDS Church believes that before the return of Christ, that the gospel must be taught to those who are in Israel, and the church must be legally established within those bounds.

Believed fulfillment state:  currently emplaced
Currently, religious proselytizing is allowed within Israel, but the LDS Church refrains from proselytizing based on an agreement with the government of Israel.

Temple in Jerusalem

The LDS Church believes that there will be a temple built within Jerusalem. The temple within Jerusalem will be built with one additional distinguishing feature that all other LDS temples do not have. This temple will contain a throne, which, at times, the Savior will personally sit and reign over the house of Israel.

Concerning the temple in Jerusalem, Orson Pratt stated, "By and by there will be a Temple built at Jerusalem. Who do you think is going to build it? You may think that it will be the unbelieving Jews who rejected the Savior. I believe that which is contained on the 77th page of the Book of Mormon, as well as in many other places, in that same book, will be literally fulfilled. The Temple at Jerusalem will undoubtedly be built, by those who believe in the true Messiah. Its construction will be, in some respects different from the Temples now being built. It will contain the throne of the Lord, upon which he will, at times, personally sit, and will reign over the house of Israel for ever. It may also contain twelve other thrones, on which the twelve ancient Apostles will sit, and judge the twelve tribes of Israel."

More recently, Bruce R. McConkie stated, "Who are those 'that are far off' who shall come to Jerusalem to build the house of the Lord? Surely they are the Jews who have been scattered afar. By what power and under whose authorization shall the work be done? There is only one place under the whole heavens where the keys of temple building are found. There is only one people who know how to build temples and what to do in them when they are completed. That people is the Latter-day Saints. The temple in Jerusalem will not be built by Jews who have assembled there for political purposes as at present. It will not be built by a people who know nothing whatever about the sealing ordinances and their application to the living and the dead. It will not be built by those who know nothing about Christ and his laws and the mysteries reserved for the saints. But it will be built by Jews who have come unto Christ, who once again are in the true fold of their ancient Shepherd, and who have learned anew about temples because they know that Elijah did come, not to sit in a vacant chair at some Jewish feast of the Passover, but to the Kirtland Temple on April 3, 1836, to Joseph Smith and Oliver Cowdery. The temple in Jerusalem will be built by The Church of Jesus Christ of Latter-day Saints. 'They that are far off,' they that come from an American Zion, they who have a temple in Salt Lake City will come to Jerusalem to build there another holy house in the Jerusalem portion of 'the mountains of the Lord's house.'"

Believed fulfillment state: Pending
A temple has not been built.

Two witnesses in Jerusalem
It is believed that two people will be called to preach the gospel in the land of Jerusalem, and that they will have the faith and power to cause miracles as seen in the Book of Revelation. Since they are given the rights to prophecy, it is believed that they are prophets. These prophets will be called to teach the gospel during a time of great conflict, and will be able to keep the nations gathered against Israel at bay for their ministry. This conflict is believed to be part of the battle of Armageddon, which is to take place near Megiddo or the Valley of Jezreel. After three and a half years, they will be killed by their enemies, and their bodies will lie in the street for three and a half days. Then a large earthquake will occur and they will rise miraculously and will ascend into heaven. Any of the twelve apostles could be considered a prophet, as they are accepted by the church as prophets, seers and revelators.

Believed fulfillment state: Pending
 The LDS Church currently does not proselytize in Israel.

Other signs preceding
According to one Latter-day Saint commentator, there are many signs, many of which have already passed.

See also

 Christian eschatology
 Dream Mine
 Eschatology
 Kingdom of God: Latter-day Saints
 Mormon cosmology

Notes

Further reading

Latter Day Saint belief and doctrine
Latter Day Saint terms
Christian eschatology